A sibyna was a type of spear used for hunting or warfare (see boar spears) in ancient times.

A long heavy spear the Illyrians used was described by the poet Ennius according to Festius. Hesychius of Alexandria, (5th century) calls it similar to a spear. Suda lexicon (10th century)  calls it a Roman javelin.

See also
Illyrian weaponry

References

Javelins
Spears
Ancient weapons
Projectiles
Illyrian warfare
Ancient Greek military terminology